List of the National Register of Historic Places listings in Franklin County, New York

This is intended to be a complete list of properties and districts listed on the National Register of Historic Places in Franklin County, New York. The locations of National Register properties and districts may be seen in a map by clicking on "Map of all coordinates".  Two areas that are further designated National Historic Landmarks are the county's portion of the Adirondack Forest Preserve and the Eagle Island Camp.

There are a total of 85 entries. Three of these Registered Historic Places are in fact historic districts which include a total of eighty buildings and other structures. To be listed on the National Register, sites must retain their historic integrity, they usually must be at least fifty years old, and their listing must be promoted – or at least not be opposed – by the current owner, so many historically important sites in the county are not listed.



Listings county-wide

 

|}

Former listings

|}

See also

National Register of Historic Places listings in New York

References

Franklin County, New York
Franklin